"Como Abeja Al Panal" (English: Like a bee to the honeycomb) is a song by Dominican Republic singer-songwriter Juan Luis Guerra released in 1990 and served as the lead single from his fifth studio album Bachata Rosa (1990). It is a song that tells the story of a forbidden love.

The song was originally released in separate verses in a two-part Commercial for Barceló Rum, as a Bachata with bolero elements and the lyrical overarching storyline of forbidden love, with the male and female lead trading stanzas. The rhythm change to salsa in the Single/CD version is omitted from the Barceló commercials. It was one of Guerra's first international hits and help to contribute to the bachata sophistication along with Estrellitas y Duendes and Bachata Rosa. The track's success demonstrated that tropical music could be fun, danceable and commercial, and at the same time, witty and complex.

Track listing 

 "Como Abeja Al Panal" – 4:09
 "Woman del Callao" – 4:23

Charts

References 

1990 songs
Juan Luis Guerra songs
Songs written by Juan Luis Guerra
1990 singles